State Route 292 (SR 292) is a west-east state highway located in the east-central part of the U.S. state of Georgia. It runs from Higgston to just east of Bellville.

Route description

Higgston to Lyons
SR 292 begins in Montgomery County at an intersection with SR 15/SR 29 in Higgston, where the roadway continues as Saw Mill Road. The route heads east and enters Toombs County, just before entering Vidalia along North Street. In downtown Vidalia, SR 292 intersects SR 130/SR 297 (McIntosh Street), where SR 130 and SR 292 share a four-block concurrency. The highway heads to the southeast, into Lyons, It parallels US 280/SR 30 along the way. In Lyons, SR 292 has intersections with US 1/SR 4 and SR 152.

Lyons to Bellville
East of Lyons is an intersection with SR 86. Just past SR 86, the route crosses the Ohoopee River, where it enters Tattnall County. Farther to the southeast, in the city of Collins, is an intersection with SR 23/SR 57/SR 121. The route continues east through Manassas and enters the city of Bellville. There, it intersects SR 169. Just east of Bellville, SR 292 meets its eastern terminus, an intersection with US 280/SR 30.

History

Major intersections

See also

References

External links
 

292
Transportation in Montgomery County, Georgia
Transportation in Toombs County, Georgia
Transportation in Tattnall County, Georgia
Transportation in Evans County, Georgia